Barry Alan Poltermann (born January 12, 1964) is an American film editor, director, and producer.

Poltermann is known for editing the Sundance Grand Prize winning documentary American Movie (1999) and Jim & Andy: The Great Beyond (2017), which debuted at the Venice Film Festival and was nominated for an Emmy in 2018. He also edited the Sundance Special Jury Prize winning feature, The Pool (2008) and the limited documentary series The Last Movie Stars (2022).

American Movie was named by The New York Times as one of the “1,000 Greatest Movies Ever Made” and the International Documentary Association named it as one of the top 20 documentaries of all time. The Life of Reilly (2007) was Rotten Tomatoes best-reviewed documentary of 2007.  I Am Not Alone won Audience Awards at the Toronto International Film Festival, Doc NYC & The American Film Institute's AFI Fest.

Poltermann has edited seven films that are Certified Fresh on Rotten Tomatoes, including American Movie, The Life of Reilly, The Pool, Collapse, Raiders!: The Story of the Greatest Fan Film Ever Made, Jim & Andy: The Great Beyond and The Last Movie Stars.

Filmography (Selected)

References

External links 
 
 Barry Poltermann on Twitter
 September.Club

Living people
Filmmakers from Milwaukee
1964 births